Carmel Christian School may refer to:

Mount Carmel Christian School, Pennsylvania, USA
Carmel Christian School, Bristol, UK
Carmel Christian School, Charlotte, USA